The 1930 United States elections were held on November 4, 1930, in the middle of Republican President Herbert Hoover's term. Taking place shortly after the start of the Great Depression, the Republican Party suffered substantial losses. The election was the last of the Fourth Party System, and marked the first time since 1918 that Democrats controlled either chamber of Congress.

The Republicans lost fifty-two seats to the Democratic Party in the House of Representatives. While the Republicans maintained a one-seat majority after the polls closed, they lost a number of special elections (since some Republican members died) before the start of the new Congress. This allowed the Democrats to take control of the chamber.

The Republicans also lost eight seats to the Democrats in the U.S. Senate, but were able to narrowly maintain control.

The election was a victory for progressives of both parties, as Republicans closely aligned with Hoover lost several Congressional elections. Additionally, New York Governor Franklin D. Roosevelt's landslide re-election established him as the front-runner for the 1932 Democratic nomination.

See also
1930 United States House of Representatives elections
1930 United States Senate elections
1930 United States gubernatorial elections

References

 
1930
United States midterm elections
November 1930 events